The 2010 Campeonato Pernambucano is the 96th edition of the Campeonato Pernambucano. The formula for this edition was different from the formula adopted in previous championships, even exist an article in the Estatuto do Torcedor (Statute supporter) which prohibits changes in the regulation within two years of validity.

Format
In the first phase, the teams played each other in home and away games in a league format. The top four teams advanced to the semi-finals, where the first in qualification played against the fourth, and the second against the third, over two legs. The winners of the semi-finals contested the final.

Participating clubs

First round

References

External links
Site oficial da Federação Pernambucana de Futebol 

2010
Pernambucano